Bothriomyrmecini is a tribe of Dolichoderinae ants with 5 genera.

Genera
Arnoldius, Dubovikov, 2005
Bothriomyrmex, Emery, 1869
Chronoxenus, Santschi, 1919
Loweriella, Shattuck, 1992
Ravavy, Fisher, 2009

References

Dolichoderinae
Ant tribes